Carmenta welchelorum is a moth of the family Sesiidae. It was described by W. Donald Duckworth and Thomas Drake Eichlin in 1977. It is known from south-central Texas in the United States.

References

External links
Moth Photographers Group. Mississippi State University.

Sesiidae
Moths described in 1977